Nadim Karam; (born 1957) is a multidisciplinary Lebanese artist and architect who fuses his artistic output with his background in architecture to create large-scale urban art projects in different cities of the world. He uses his vocabulary of forms in urban settings to narrate stories and evoke collective memory with a very particular whimsical, often absurdist approach; seeking to 'create moments of dreams' in different cities of the world.

Early life and education 

Nadim Karam grew up in Beirut. He received a Bachelor of Architecture from the American University of Beirut in 1982, at the height of the Lebanese civil war, and left the same year to study in Japan on a Monbusho scholarship. At the University of Tokyo he developed an interest in Japanese philosophy of space, which he studied under Hiroshi Hara, and was also taught by Fumihiko Maki and Tadao Ando. He created several solo art performances and exhibitions in Tokyo while completing master and doctorate degrees in architecture.

Teaching 

Nadim Karam taught at the Shibaura Institute of Technology in Tokyo in 1992 with Riichi Miyake and then returned to Beirut to create his experimental group, Atelier Hapsitus. The name, derived from the combination of Hap (happenings) and Situs (situations), comes from Karam's enjoyment of the fact that the encounter of these two factors often gives rise to the unexpected.  He taught architectural design at the American University of Beirut (1993-5, 2003–4), and was Dean of the Faculty of Architecture, Art and Design at Notre Dame University in Lebanon from 2000 to 2003. He co-chaired in 2002 the UN/New York University conference in London for the reconstruction of Kabul and was selected as the curator for Lebanon by the first Rotterdam Biennale. From 2006 to 2007 he served on the Moutamarat Design Board for Dubai and regularly gives lectures at universities and conferences worldwide.

Urban art projects 

With Atelier Hapsitus, the pluri-disciplinary company he founded in Beirut, he created large-scale urban art projects in different cities including Beirut, Prague, London, Tokyo, Nara and Melbourne.  His project for Prague's Manes Bridge in the spring of 1997 was both a commemoration of the city's post-communist liberalization and an echo of its history, with the placement of his works in parallel to the baroque sculptures on the Charles Bridge.  The post-civil war 1997–2000 itinerant urban art project he created for central Beirut was one of five worldwide selected by the Van Alen Institute in New York in 2002 to highlight the role they played in the rejuvenation of city life and morale after a disaster. 
In Japan, 'The Three flowers of Jitchu' realized at Tōdai-ji Temple in Nara in 2004, was a temporary installation commemorating the achievements of a Middle Eastern monk, Jitchu, whose performance is still enacted yearly since the year 752 in the temple he designed for it. Karam's project took 20 years to gain acceptance from the Tōdai-ji Temple authorities.
His 2006 Victoria State commission'The Travellers' a permanent art installation of ten sculptures which travel across Melbourne's Sandridge Bridge three times daily, tells the story of Australian immigrants and creates an urban clock in the city.

Selected public art installations

2020 On Parade: Desert X, AlUla
2020 Politics of Dialogue: The Merry-Go-Round, United World College Maastricht, Maastricht, the Netherlands
2017		Trio Elephants-Lovers’ Park, Yerevan, Armenia 
2017		Wheels of Innovation-Nissan Headquarters, Tokyo, Japan
2016		Stretching Thoughts: Shepherd and Thinker- UWC Atlantic College, Wales, UK
2014	Wishing Flower- Zaha Hadid's D’Leedon residential project, Leedon Heights, Singapore

Architectural work 

Nadim Karam is mainly known for his conceptual work, like 'Hilarious Beirut', the 1993 post-war anti-establishment project for the reconstruction of Beirut city centre, and 'The Cloud', a huge public garden resembling a raincloud that stands at 250 m above ground. Inspired by the city of Dubai, it proposes a visual and social alternative to the exclusivity of the skyscrapers in Gulf cities. Karam's signature un-built projects include the 'Net Bridge' a pedestrian bridge conceived as a gateway to Beirut city centre from the marina, with five lanes that playfully intersect and interweave. Similarly, his winning design of a competition for the BLC Bank headquarters for Beirut features the new headquarters straddling the old. Karam collaborates closely with Arup Engineers in London, who give structural and technical reality to his most unusual ideas.

Ongoing projects 

The Dialogue of the Hills is an urban art project conceived to invigorate the historic core of Amman through a series of public gardens and sculpture for each hill community. The sculptures are designed to create a dialogue with the others on the surrounding hills of the city, physically and visually linking diverse socio-economic communities. 
The Wheels of Chicago is a project inspired by the city where the Ferris wheel was invented.

Art works

Selected solo exhibitions 

2017: “Urban Stories” — Fine Art Society, London, UK
2016: “Shhhhhhh…shout!” — Art Dubai, Dubai, UAE  
“Stretching Thoughts” — Ayyam Gallery, Beirut, Lebanon 
2013: “99 Objects possible to find on a Cloud”, — Ayyam Gallery Dubai (AlQuoz), September – November *2013
2013: “Urban Zoo” — Ayyam Gallery Beirut, August–October 2013
2013: “Shooting the Cloud” — Ayyam Gallery London, January 2013
2013 & 2011: Menasart, Beirut International Exhibition, BIEL
2010: The Wild Cat and other sculptures, DIFC Gate, Dubai
2008: The Fisherman fishing from a Cloud, installation, Creek Art Fair, Bastakiya, Dubai
2008: Clouds & Chairs, Sultan Gallery, Kuwait
2002: 101 archaic procession elements, rooftop installation in Leeds, UK
2001: London & Dublin project, exhibition, Unesco, Beirut
2001: Solfeggio 101, exhibition, Portside Gallery, Yokohama, Japan
1999: The Giraffe, the Wild Cat & the apparently Digested Objects, British Council, Beirut
1998: Hilarious Beirut, exhibition, Order of Engineers & Architects/Beirut, Venice Institute of Architecture/Venice, Berlin Technical University/Berlin 
1997: Bartlett School of Architecture/London
1997: T-Races PCB-137, exhibition, Manes Gallery/Prague, Fragnera Gallery/Prague 
1996: Bartlett School of Architecture/London 
1996: Arhus University/Denmark
1995: Galleri ROM, Oslo / French Cultural Centre, Beirut
1992: Spinning Caves, exhibition, Formes Gallery, Tokyo &Kikukawa Gallery, Oita
1991: The Carrier, exhibition, Marunouchi Gallery, Tokyo
1990: Temple of the Obelisks, installation & performance, Sagacho Exhibit Space, Tokyo/ Intercrossings, IMA project exhibition & performance, French-Japanese Institute of Tokyo
1987: Architectural Crisis, performance, Cealacanth House, Osaka / Celebration of Life: The Funeral, performance & exhibition, Spiral Garden, Tokyo
1986: Micropluralism, exhibition, Striped House Museum of Art, Tokyo / Family Crisis, performance, Yamagata

Selected group exhibitions 

2016: Art Dubai — Dubai, UAE*
2015: Art Abu Dhabi- Abu Dhabi, UAE*
Art Dubai — Dubai, UAE*
2014: JISP Biennale 2014- Jing An Sculpture Park, Shanghai, China
	Art Dubai — Dubai, UAE**
2013: Art Dubai — Dubai, UAE*
2013: 'Closets & Closets' series and ‘Trio Elephants’, as part of the “25 years of Arab Creativity” exhibition at Abu Dhabi Festival 2013, Art Abu Dhabi and the Institut du Monde Arabe (IMA), Paris, 2012
2012: The Cloud, The Fisherman & The Mutating Cities, Villa Empain Exhibition, Brussels
2012: “Subtitled: WITH NARRATIVES FROM LEBANON”, at the Royal College of Art, London as part of the Association for the Promotion and Exhibition of the Arts in Lebanon (APEAL)
2011: Chatsworth Beyond Limits at the Sotheby's, London
2010: Convergence, American University Museum, Katzen Arts Centre, Washington / Contemporabia, Beirut, March
2009: Stories from the Levant, Ayyam Dubai / Nadim Karam & Safwan Dahoul, Ayyam Beirut
2006: Liverpool Independent Art Biennale
2003: Exhibition, Renewing, Rebuilding, Remembering, The Lighthouse, Glasgow, Scotland, Van Alen Institute, New York, 2002.
1996: Venice Biennale of Architecture, South Korean Pavilion
1996: Erotisches Museum Berlin, Aedes Gallery, Berlin
1995: Kwangju Biennale of Art, Korea

Awards 

10th FEA Distinguished Alumnus Award
ASI steel Award 2008
Urban Design Award 2006
Melbourne Prize 2007

Publications 

2013	: ‘Stretching Thoughts’, Booth-Clibborn Editions, London
2007: ‘The Cloud, the Desert and the Arabian Breeze’, Booth-Clibborn Editions, London
2006: ‘Urban Toys’, Booth-Clibborn Editions, London, with introduction by Paul Virilio
2000: VOYAGE, Booth-Clibborn Editions, London

Further reading 

Arkimeet 2013 "ARCHITECTS MEET in ISTANBUL"
“Shooting the cloud”
Interview with Ricardo Karam Domus
Curve Magazine
Pearl Elephant
Urban Design

References

External links 
 
 

American University of Beirut alumni
Lebanese painters
Lebanese sculptors
Lebanese architects
1957 births
Living people
Lebanese emigrants to Senegal
Lebanese contemporary artists